The Rugby Football League Championship First Division was the top division of rugby league in England between 1895 and 1996, when it was replaced by the Super League.

History

1895–1904: Foundations

The first season of rugby league (1895–96) saw all the breakaway clubs play in a single league competition. The addition of new teams and the problems of travelling led to the league being split in two for the following season; into the Yorkshire League and the Lancashire League. This arrangement lasted until the 1901–02 season, when the top clubs from each league resigned and formed a single new competition. The following season the remaining clubs in the Yorkshire and Lancashire Leagues were re-organised to form a second division.

1905–1970: Restructure
In 1905–06 the two divisions were re-combined into a single competition. Clubs played all the teams in their own county on a home-and-away basis, results counting towards the re-formed Yorkshire and Lancashire Leagues. They also organised inter-county fixtures on an individual basis; all results were collated into a single table for the Championship. In order to even up the competition a top-four play-off series was used to determine the Championship.

Apart from the interventions of the two world wars, this system was retained until the 1962–63 season, when the league briefly returned to a two divisional system. This lasted only two years, and in the 1964–65 season they returned to one large division subdivided into county leagues. The play-offs were expanded to the top 16 teams and the Harry Sunderland Trophy was introduced as the man-of-the-match award for the decider.

1970–1995: Premiership and reintroducing Second Division
In the 1973–74 season they once again went back to two divisions. The play-off and the Yorkshire and Lancashire League were abandoned, and a new play-off type competition, the Premiership, was introduced however the team finishing top of the Championship were crowned champions. During this period in the late 1980s and early 1990s Wigan dominated both the Championship and Challenge Cup.

Champions

Winning records by club

§ Denotes club now defunct

Rugby league competitions in the United Kingdom
Professional sports leagues in the United Kingdom
Sports leagues established in 1895
Sports leagues disestablished in 1996
1895 establishments in the United Kingdom